Adrián Terrazas-González is a Mexican multi-instrumentalist who plays flute, tenor saxophone, bass clarinet, and percussion. He was a member of the progressive rock band The Mars Volta from 2005 to 2008.

Discography

As leader
Cu Taan (2009)

With The Mars Volta
Frances The Mute (2005)
Scabdates (2005)
Amputechture (2006)
The Bedlam in Goliath (2008)

With Omar Rodríguez-López
Omar Rodriguez (2005)
Please Heat This Eventually (2006)
Se Dice Bisonte, No Búfalo (2007)
Omar Rodriguez-Lopez & Lydia Lunch (2007)
The Apocalypse Inside of An Orange (2007)
Calibration (Is Pushing Luck and Key Too Far) (2007)
Absence Makes the Heart Grow Fungus (2008)
Old Money (2008)
Woman Gives Birth To Tomato! (2013)
Some Need It Lonely (2016)

As sideman
With Juan Alderete
Und Die Scheiße Ändert Sich Immer (2006) as Big Sir
Halo Orbit (2016/2017)

With Zechs Marquise
Our Delicate Stranded Nightmare (2008)

With Troker
El Rey Del Camino (2010)

With Alex Otaola
El Hombre de la Camara (2010)

With Trevor Hall
Everything Everytime Everywhere (2011)

With The Memorials
Delirium (2012)

With Candiria
Not yet Reales (2013)

References

External links

Official Facebook Profile
Adrián Terrazas-González - Samson Technologies
www.daddario.com Woodwind artists

1975 births
Living people
Grammy Award winners
Mexican classical musicians
Mexican composers
Mexican male composers
Mexican flautists
Mexican jazz musicians
People from Chihuahua City
Saxophonists
University of Texas at El Paso alumni
Latin jazz musicians
21st-century saxophonists
21st-century male musicians
Male jazz musicians
21st-century flautists